The Ármann women's basketball team, commonly known as Ármann, is the women's basketball team of Glímufélagið Ármann multi-sport club, based in Reykjavík, Iceland. It has won the national championship three times, in 1953, 1959 and 1960.

History
Ármann won the ignaural national championship in 1953 and added two more in 1959 and 1960. In 2009, the players, unhappy with poor training facilities and lack of practice time from the club, contacted Ungmennafélagið Stjarnan and inquired if the board would be interested in starting a women's team. The Stjarnan board responded positively, as they had been unsuccessfully trying to start a women's team for a few years, and in the end all 14 Ármann players transferred over to form the first Stjarnan women's team. Ármann did not field a team again until the 2017–2018 season when it failed to register a win in 24 games in the 1. deild kvenna. In May 2020, the team returned to the 1. deild kvenna for the first time since 2018. On 15 March 2022, the team won the 1. deild kvenna championship, its first title in 62 years, after winning 18 of 20 games, including 15 in a row to finish the season.

Trophies and achievements

Titles
Úrvalsdeild kvenna:
Winners (3): 1953, 1959, 1960
1. deild kvenna:
Winners (1): 2022

Awards
1. deild kvenna Domestic Player of the Year
Jónína Þórdís Karlsdóttir – 2021

1. deild kvenna Domestic All-First team
Jónína Þórdís Karlsdóttir – 2021

References

Basketball teams in Iceland
Basketball teams established in 1953
1953 establishments in Iceland